Stadium Australia (currently known as Accor Stadium for sponsorship purposes), is a multi-purpose stadium located in the Sydney Olympic Park, in Sydney, Australia. The stadium, which in Australia is sometimes referred to as Sydney Olympic Stadium, Homebush Stadium or simply the Olympic Stadium, was completed in March 1999 at a cost of A$690 million to host the 2000 Summer Olympics. The Stadium was leased by a private company, the Stadium Australia Group, until the Stadium was sold back to the NSW Government on 1 June 2016 after NSW Premier Michael Baird announced the Stadium was to be redeveloped as a world-class rectangular stadium. The Stadium is owned by Venues NSW on behalf of the NSW Government.

The stadium was originally built to hold circa 115,000 spectators, making it the largest Olympic Stadium ever built and the second largest stadium in Australia after the Melbourne Cricket Ground which held more than 120,000 before its re-design in the early 2000s. In 2003, reconfiguration work was completed to shorten the north and south wings, and install movable seating. These changes reduced the capacity to 80,000, with the capacity to add seating depending on the venue configuration.  Awnings were also added over the north and south stands, allowing most of the seating to be under cover. The stadium was engineered along sustainable lines, e.g., utilising less steel in the roof structure than the Olympic stadiums of Athens and Beijing.

Naming rights
The stadium lacked a naming rights sponsor in its formative years, bearing the name Stadium Australia between its opening in 1999 and 2002. In 2002, telecommunications company Telstra acquired the naming rights, resulting in the stadium being known as Telstra Stadium. On 12 December 2007 it was announced by the Stadium Australia Group (SAG) that the stadium's name was to be changed to ANZ Stadium after concluding a deal with ANZ Bank worth around A$31.5 million over seven years. This change took effect on 1 January 2008. In 2014, ANZ renewed the deal through to the end of 2017 and again until its closure for rebuilding in October 2019.

In December 2020, ANZ's naming rights to the stadium expired and it reverted to being Stadium Australia.

In November 2021, multinational hospitality company Accor acquired the rights, with the venue to be known as Accor Stadium.

History

Early history

The first sporting event held at the stadium was on 6 March 1999 when a then-record rugby league football crowd of 104,583 watched the NRL first round double-header, featuring Newcastle v Manly and Parramatta v St George Illawarra Dragons. The attendance broke the old record of 102,569 set at the Odsal Stadium in Bradford, England for the Challenge Cup Final replay between Warrington and Halifax held on 5 May 1954.

The first musical act held at the newly built stadium was the Bee Gees, consisting of Barry, Robin and Maurice Gibb, on March 27, 1999. The band had embarked on what would be their final world tour as a group before the death of Maurice, the tour ending in the newly built Olympic Stadium. The show was sold out with an attendance of 66,285.

The stadium was not officially opened until 12 June 1999 when the Australian National Soccer team played the FIFA All Stars. Australia won the match 3–2 in front of a crowd of 88,101. Stadium Australia also played host to the national side's historic playoff win over Uruguay in November 2005, a victory which granted Australia FIFA World Cup qualification for only the second time in the country's history. The event attracted a virtual capacity crowd of 82,698.

The 1999 Bledisloe Cup rugby union match between Australia and New Zealand attracted a then-world record rugby union crowd of 107,042. In 2000, this was bettered when a near-capacity crowd of 109,874 (capacity at the time was 110,000) witnessed the "greatest ever rugby match" when a Jonah Lomu try sealed an All Blacks win over the Wallabies 39–35. The All Blacks had led 24-0 after 11 minutes only to see Australia draw level at 24–24 by halftime.

An exhibition soccer match between the Australia national team and English club Manchester United was played on 18 July 1999. Manchester United defeated Australia 1–0 in front of 78,000 spectators.

On 9 June 1999, the stadium hosted its first ever State of Origin series game between New South Wales and Queensland. The match, Game 2 of the three-game series, saw the record Origin attendance in Sydney when 88,336 saw the Blues christen their new home with a 12–8 win. The attendance broke the Origin attendance record of 87,161 set at the Melbourne Cricket Ground for Game 2 of the 1994 series.

On 7 August 1999, a National Football League (American football) exhibition game called the American Bowl was played between the Denver Broncos and the San Diego Chargers, bringing home former Australian Football League player Darren Bennett, the Chargers' punter. The Broncos won the game 20–17 in front of 73,811 spectators. This was Australia's first, and currently only, American Bowl game.

The 1999 National Rugby League grand final, played on 26 September between the Melbourne Storm and the St George Illawarra Dragons, broke the rugby league world-record crowd previously set earlier in the season when 107,999 came to watch the Storm defeat the Dragons 20–18 to win their first NRL premiership.

During the 2000 Olympics, the evening athletics sessions on day 11 attracted 112,524 spectators on the night that Australia's Cathy Freeman won the Olympic Gold Medal for the Women's 400 metres. As of 2014, this remains the world record attendance for any athletics event. Also during the Olympics, the soccer final attracted 104,098 to witness Cameroon defeat Spain for its first-ever Olympic gold medal. This was an Olympic Games football attendance record, breaking the record of 101,799 set at the Rose Bowl during the Gold medal game of the 1984 Olympic Games in Los Angeles.

The opening ceremony for the 2000 Summer Olympics at the stadium completely sold out all 110,000 seats, while the highest attendance for any event in modern Olympic Games history was recorded with 114,714 at the stadium for the closing ceremony of the same Games. Musical acts for the closing ceremony were a "who's who" of Australian music including Kylie Minogue, John Williamson, John Paul Young, Jimmy Barnes, Midnight Oil, INXS (with Jon Stevens), Men at Work, and Slim Dusty who sang Waltzing Matilda. Also in attendance on stage during the Closing ceremony were other famous Australian's including golfer Greg Norman and comedian-actor Paul Hogan.The venue also hosted the same events during the 2000 Summer Paralympics.

Post-reconfiguration

The Sydney Swans v Collingwood Australian Football League (AFL) match at the Stadium on Saturday, 23 August 2003 set an attendance record for the largest crowd to watch an Australian rules football match outside Victoria with 72,393 spectators (87.7% capacity) attending and was the largest home-and-away AFL crowd at any Australian stadium for 2003. The attendance broke the record of 66,897 set at Football Park in Adelaide, South Australia on 28 September 1976 for the South Australian National Football League (SANFL) grand final between the Sturt and Port Adelaide Football Clubs.

2 October 2005 saw 82,453 attend the NRL grand final in which the Wests Tigers defeated the North Queensland Cowboys 30–16.

16 November 2005 saw 82,698 attend the second leg of the Oceania-South America Qualification Playoff game for qualification to the 2006 FIFA World Cup. Australia defeated Uruguay 1–0, which led to a penalty shootout as Uruguay had won the first leg of the playoff 1–0. Australia won the shootout 4–2 and secured a spot in the World Cup for the first time since 1974. The penalty spot where John Aloisi's spot kick secured victory has been permanently preserved and is on public display at the stadium.

On 1 October 2006, the stadium hosted the 2006 NRL Grand Final between the Brisbane Broncos and Melbourne Storm. It was the first time since the competition began in 1908 that two teams from outside of Sydney had contested the grand final. 79,609 fans saw the Broncos defeat the Storm 15–8. As of the 2018 NRL Grand Final, this is one of three times that no Sydney based team has contested the premiership decider and also the only time an NRL grand final at the Olympic Stadium has failed to attract at least 80,000 fans.

On 5 October 2008, the Manly-Warringah Sea Eagles defeated the Melbourne Storm 40–0 in the 2008 NRL Grand Final in front of 80,388 fans. This is the record winning margin for a grand final, breaking the previous record of 38-0 when Eastern Suburbs defeated St George in the 1975 Grand Final played at the Sydney Cricket Ground. 2008 was the centenary year of the competition. It was also the first time a team had been held scoreless in a grand final since Manly had defeated Cronulla-Sutherland 16–0 in the 1978 Grand Final Replay at the SCG (the original Grand Final that year had been drawn 11-11).

In February 2009, the stadium replaced its existing two television screens with new Panasonic HD LED video screens that measure 23x10m – 70% larger than the original screens, and 50% larger than the screens in the Beijing National Stadium, whilst consuming less power than the old screens. Additionally, an LED perimeter screen showcasing ANZ advertising has been installed on the second level from the 30m line to the 30m line.

25 September 2009 saw the largest ever NRL finals attendance (non-grand final) in competition history when 74,549 fans saw the Parramatta Eels defeat the Bulldogs RLFC 22–12 in the preliminary final of the 2009 NRL season. This beat the previous finals record of 57,973 set at the Sydney Cricket Ground for the preliminary final of the 1963 NSWRFL season which St George defeat Parramatta 12–7.

It hosted its first ever International Cricket match when Australia took on India in a Twenty20 night game on 1 February 2012. The match attracted a crowd of 59,569 which remains the largest crowd ever for a cricket match in New South Wales.

30 September 2012 saw the largest ever NRL Grand Final crowd since reconfiguration up until 2014 when 82,976 attended the 2012 NRL Grand Final to see the Melbourne Storm defeat the Canterbury-Bankstown Bulldogs 14–4. This number was nearly reached in the 2009 NRL Grand Final between the Storm and the Parramatta Eels, with 82,538 in attendance. On 13 and 14 December 2010, a U2 concert, one of the biggest in history, was held at the ANZ Stadium.

On 6 July 2013 a new rectangle configuration record attendance of 83,702 watched the British & Irish Lions defeat Australia 41–16 to win the Tom Richards Cup series by 2–1.

The record set by the Wallabies test was broken just 10 days later on 17 July when 83,813 (only 187 short of capacity) attended Game 3 of the 2013 State of Origin series. Queensland defeated NSW 12–10 to win their 8th straight Origin series. With 80,380 attending Game 1 at the stadium, the attendances also broke the Origin attendance records for the first and third game of a series. With the second game of the series attracting 51,690 to Brisbane's Suncorp Stadium, 2013 also broke the Origin series attendance record with 215,883 attending the three games.

On 6 September 2013, the largest ever NRL minor round attendance for a single game at the stadium was set when 59,708 saw eventual 2013 Premiers the Sydney Roosters defeat South Sydney 24–12 in the final round of the 2013 NRL season. This was also the largest single game minor round crowd in the history of the premiership dating back to 1908, breaking the previous record set at the ANZ Stadium in Brisbane (now known as the Queensland Sport and Athletics Centre) on 27 August 1993 when St George defeated Brisbane 16–10 in Round 22 of the 1993 NSWRL season in front of 58,593 fans.

On 18 June 2014, 83,421 fans saw NSW defeat Qld 6–4 in Game 2 of the 2014 State of Origin series. After having won Game 1 at the Suncorp Stadium in Brisbane, the home side's win saw Queensland's eight year domination of Origin come to an end as New South Wales won their first series since 2005.

On 5 October 2014, a new post-reconfiguration attendance record of 83,833 saw South Sydney defeat Canterbury-Bankstown 30–6 in the 2014 NRL Grand Final. It was the Rabbitohs first grand final appearance and premiership win since 1971.

On 27 December 2014, a new domestic cricket record crowd for NSW was set with 32,823 attending the Sydney Derby between the Sydney Thunder and the Sydney Sixers. The crowd was the highest domestic cricket crowd in NSW history, only to be knocked off a few weeks later at the Sydney Cricket Ground involving the same two teams.

History was repeated on 4 October 2015 when for only the second time in the NRL's history, no NSW team was in the grand final and for the first time ever, it was a Queensland derby in the final between Brisbane and North Queensland. 82,758 people, many of whom had travelled down from various parts of Queensland, witnessed one of the all-time great grand finals when the game went into golden point time courtesy of a Kyle Feldt try in the dying moments to level the scores at 16 all. But the game would be remembered for Ben Hunt's dropped ball from the kick-off to extra time which led to Johnathan Thurston's field goal that gave North Queensland their first ever premiership in the NRL since being admitted into the competition in 1995. Apart from games involving national teams, the crowd is the largest ever in NSW not to involve a team based in the state.

On 30 September 2018, the Grand Final between the Sydney Roosters and the Melbourne Storm featured one of the most courageous performances in Australian sporting history when Cooper Cronk, despite carrying a severe shoulder injury from the week before, played for nearly the entire match, inspiring his Roosters to a famous 21–6 victory over his former club and at the same time denying the Storm back to back premierships.

On 6 October 2019, another notable NRL Grand Final was held with 82,922 people witnessing the Sydney Roosters become the first back to back premiers in the NRL since the Brisbane Broncos of 1992 and 1993, defeating the Canberra Raiders who were in their first Grand Final since 1994 in controversial circumstances. During the 2nd half with 10 minutes to go with scores locked at 8 all, referee Ben Cummins initially gave Canberra a new set of six tackles after he thought a Roosters player touched the ball, but then retracted the call as Canberra's Jack Wighton was tackled with the ball and ordered a handover to the Roosters with James Tedesco scoring the winning try for the Roosters shortly after the handover to win 14–8.

Development

In October 2001, major reconfiguration work on the stadium was commenced to allow for sports that require an oval field, such as cricket and Australian rules football, to be played at the ground. The two wing stands and the athletics track were removed; they were replaced with a movable seating section. New roofs were built over the two ends and seats that had a poor view of the field were removed. The reconfiguration reduced the capacity to 84,000 for the rectangular field and 82,500 for the oval field at a total cost of $80 million. The construction work was carried out by Multiplex.

The reconfiguration work was completed in October 2003 in time for the 2003 Rugby World Cup where the then Telstra Stadium hosted the opening game, two other groups games, both semi-finals, the third-place play-off and final matches of the competition. In the first semi-final on 15 November 2003, Australia beat New Zealand 22–10 and then in the second semi-final the following day England beat France 24–7. In the final, on 22 November, England beat Australia 20–17 in extra time.

In 2022, a new scoreboard was installed at the southern end of the stadium, measuring 120 metres wide. Also in 2022, the stadium lighting was replaced with new LED sports lights and were first used in Game One of the 2022 State of Origin series.

Proposed renovations
In September 2015, the New South Wales Government announced it intended to upgrade the stadium within the next decade, and install a retractable roof over the stadium.

On 23 November 2017, the New South Wales Government revealed that Stadium Australia would be knocked down and completely re-built, with a new 75,000 seat rectangular stadium built in its place. The announcement was made in conjunction with the unveiling of rebuilding plans for the Sydney Football Stadium in Moore Park. The original plan for Stadium Australia was for the demolition to start in 2019 and the new stadium to be completed by 2021.

On 29 March 2018 NSW Premier Gladys Berejiklian backflipped on the rebuilding plan, and revealed the government would instead refurbish Stadium Australia and reconfigure the pitch dimensions to a permanently rectangular shape. This would come at a cost of $800 million, compared to the knock-down and rebuild cost of $1.3 billion.

On 31 May 2020, the renovation plans were cancelled by the government, who pointed to a shift in budget priorities as a result of the ongoing COVID-19 pandemic. The decision meant the stadium remained capable of hosting oval-shaped sports such as cricket and Australian rules football, and retain its capacity to 83,500.

Uses
Various sporting codes have used this ground on a regular basis. The National Rugby League is the most regular tenant of the ground, while rugby union internationals, soccer internationals and Australian rules football are all played at the ground. ANZ Stadium hosts the following:

Rugby league

 Two teams play the majority of their home games there: Canterbury-Bankstown Bulldogs (since 1999) and South Sydney Rabbitohs (since 2006). 
The Parramatta Eels played two home games a year at Stadium Australia between 2008 and 2016. Parramatta then called the stadium their temporary home from 2017 until April 2019 while their regular home ground Parramatta Stadium was demolished; with the Western Sydney Stadium built in its place. 
The Wests Tigers now share the Western Sydney Stadium with Parramatta, using it as one of their three home grounds, having previously used the stadium between 2005–2008 and 2014–2018. Since 2021, Accor Stadium has been their home ground for Easter Monday home games against Parramatta. 
The St George Illawarra Dragons called Stadium Australia their Sydney home in 2008 while their home ground, Kogarah Oval was redeveloped, and again for 2 games a year between 2014 and 2017.
 All New South Wales home games of the State of Origin series are played at the stadium each year (either one or two annually since 1999), and every NRL Grand Final has been held there since 1999 with the exception of the 2021 NRL Grand Final, which was played at Lang Park, Brisbane due to ongoing COVID-19 lockdowns in New South Wales.
 The North Sydney Bears and Manly Warringah played at least one home game at Stadium Australia in its opening year.

Rugby union
 In October and November 2003, the stadium hosted seven matches in the 2003 Rugby World Cup. Among them were  the opener on 10 October, which Australia won 24–8 against Argentina, both semifinals and the final on 22 November, which England won against Australia 20-17 following Jonny Wilkinson's 100th-minute drop goal to win their first Rugby World Cup.
 On 6 July 2013, the last test of the 2013 British & Irish Lions tour was played in the ANZ Stadium, with the Lions winning 41–16 to win the series.
 On 2 August 2014, the stadium played host to the Super Rugby Final between the New South Wales Waratahs and the Canterbury Crusaders. A record Super Rugby crowd of over 61,800 witnessed the Waratahs defeat the Crusaders in a thriller, 33–32.

Cricket

 The Stadium has been approved as a ground for international cricket and has hosted Twenty20 Internationals.
 The Stadium was home to the Sydney Thunder franchise of the Big Bash League from 2011 to 2014. In June 2015, the Thunder announced they would leave ANZ Stadium and play all home games at Sydney Showground Stadium until the 2024-25 BBL season.
 It hosted its first ever International Cricket match when Australia took on India in a Twenty20 night game on 1 February 2012 and hosted its last T20 International in 2014.

Soccer

As the largest capacity stadium in Australia that can be configured for rectangular field sports, important Australia national soccer team (Socceroos) games are staged at the stadium. The stadium hosted Australia's 2005 shootout victory over Uruguay in the OFC-CONMEBOL playoff, which qualified the Socceroos for the 2006 FIFA World Cup, their first appearance since 1974. Australia's extra time victory over South Korea in the 2015 AFC Asian Cup Final, which marked the Socceroos' first Asian Cup victory, also came at the stadium.

Sydney FC have played a number of one-off exhibition matches at the stadium. Sydney FC defeated the Los Angeles Galaxy of MLS 5–3 in front of a crowd of 80,295 in 2007. The game was notable for including Galaxy legend and US international Landon Donovan and former England captain David Beckham, who had joined the Galaxy in 2007 and scored from a direct free kick during the game.

The local A-League teams, Sydney FC and Western Sydney Wanderers, have also hosted a number of English Premier League teams. Chelsea defeated Sydney FC 1–0 in front of a crowd of 83,598 on 2 June 2015, the largest crowd for a soccer game at the stadium since the post-Olympics reconfiguration in 2002. Everton defeated Sydney FC 1–0 in front of a crowd of 40,466 in 2010. Tottenham Hotspur defeated Sydney FC 1–0 in front of a crowd of over 71,500 on 30 May 2015. The stadium hosted two exhibition matches in 2017: Liverpool defeated Sydney FC 3–0 in front of a crowd of 72,892 on 24 May 2017, while on 13 July 2017, Arsenal defeated Sydney FC 2–0 in front of a crowd of 80,432. Arsenal would play Western Sydney Wanderers in the stadium two days later, with the English side winning 3–1 in front of a crowd of 83,221.

The A-League All Stars have also played a number of one-off exhibition matches at the stadium. Premier League side Manchester United defeated the A-League All Stars 5-1 in front of a crowd of 83,127 on 20 July 2013. Italian Serie A side Juventus defeated the A-League All Stars 3-2 in front of a crowd of 55,364 on 10 August 2014. The game was also notable for Juventus legend Alessandro Del Piero, at the time with Sydney FC, playing against Juventus for the first time.

The stadium hosted several games of the 2015 AFC Asian Cup, including the final.

Stadium Australia also hosts a smaller number of domestic A-League matches when the need arises. Sydney FC hosted an A-League home game on 9 January 2016 against Newcastle Jets at this ground. Western Sydney Wanderers used the stadium as well as Sydney Showground Stadium as their home grounds while Pirtek Stadium was demolished and replaced by Western Sydney Stadium. On 8 October 2016, they attracted an A-League record crowd of 61,880 in a Sydney Derby against Sydney FC.

The stadium will host the opening match of Australia vs Republic of Ireland and the knock-out matches of the 2023 FIFA Women's World Cup, including the final.

Australian rules football

 All home Australian Football League finals hosted by the Sydney Swans were played at this ground between 2003 and 2016, except for one in 2005 due to the stadium being unavailable. The first three Sydney Derbies were also played at the venue, however, the Swans home game moved to the Sydney Cricket Ground in 2013 and the Giants home game moved to Sydney Showground Stadium in 2014.
 The Sydney Swans played up to three "blockbuster" games at the venue each season between 2002 and 2015, with their remaining eight home games played at the Sydney Cricket Ground (SCG). As of 2016, the Swans no longer play at Stadium Australia, with all of their home games moving back to the Sydney Cricket Ground on a full-time basis.
 The Greater Western Sydney Giants has Accor Stadium as an option for home games when the Sydney Showground Stadium, their primary home ground, is unavailable. In 2022, Australian rules football returned to the ground for a round one match between the Giants and Sydney Swans. This was the first Australian rules football match to be played at the venue since September 2016, and the first sporting event to be played with a new 120 metre-long scoreboard installed at the stadium's southern end.
 The Swans shifted all home games in 2016 to the SCG, including its three scheduled games at ANZ Stadium. However, the stadium did host a qualifying final derby between the Sydney Swans and Greater Western Sydney Giants on 10 September 2016. A crowd of 60,222 attended the match, the highest attendance for an Australian rules football match in New South Wales since 2007.

Motorsports
On 26 October 2002, Stadium Australia played host to Motorcycle speedway with the Speedway Grand Prix of Australia, the 10th and final round of the 2002 Speedway Grand Prix World Championship series. Also representing Australia at the meeting were Leigh Adams who finished 4th in the World Championship, and meeting wildcard riders Jason Lyons and Mick Poole. The event attracted approximately 31,500 fans.

Stadium Australia played host to the first-ever Monster Jam Australia event in 2013, and remains the only venue to feature on all four Australian tours as of 2016.

American football
When it was known as Stadium Australia, the venue hosted the American Bowl on 7 August 1999 between the Denver Broncos and the San Diego Chargers, which was the first professional American football game to be held in the Southern Hemisphere.

On 27 August 2016, the stadium hosted the Sydney Cup—a season-opening 2016 NCAA Division I FBS college football game between the California Golden Bears and the Hawaii Rainbow Warriors.

Concerts
 The Bee Gees, consisting of Barry, Robin and Maurice Gibb, played the first concert at the stadium on March 27, 1999. The show was sold out with an attendance of 66,285.
 Australian rock band AC/DC played 3 shows in February 2010 (18th, 20th & 22nd) as part of their Black Ice World Tour, supported by Wolfmother. Respectively the shows had an attendance of 70,282, 75,867 and 66,896.
 Irish rock band U2 performed at the stadium on 10, 11 and 13 November 2006 to a combined attendance of 206,568 people, as part of their Vertigo Tour. They returned 13 and 14 December 2010 to a combined attendance of 107,155 people, as part of their U2 360° Tour.
 US rock band Bon Jovi performed at the stadium on 14 December 2013. The show was sold out with a crowd of 60,510 and it was the biggest concert at the stadium since U2 in 2010. 
 Rapper Eminem performed at the stadium on 22 February 2014. The show was sold out with an attendance of 53,649 people. He returned to the stadium on 22 February 2019, exactly 5 years later.
 American singer-songwriter Taylor Swift performed at the stadium on 28 November 2015, playing to a sold-out crowd of 75,980, as part of The 1989 World Tour. Swift returned to the stadium on 2 November 2018 as part of her Reputation Stadium Tour, again playing to a sold-out crowd.
 American rock band Guns N' Roses performed at the stadium on February 10 and 11 2017 to a combined attendance of 84,277 people, as part of their Not in This Lifetime... Tour. The band returned to perform on November 27 2022, as part of their 2020 Tour.
 British singer-songwriter Adele performed at the stadium on 10 and 11 March 2017, as part of Adele Live 2017. The singer played to a total of 200,000 people, making her two concerts the highest attended concerts in the history of the stadium. This is the largest audience the venue has seen since the 2000 Sydney Olympics, breaking Taylor Swift's 2015 record of 75,980 audience members.
 Canadian singer Justin Bieber performed at the stadium on 15 March 2017 to an attendance of 65,836 people, as part of his Purpose World Tour.
 Foo Fighters performed at the stadium on 27 January 2018, to 71,314 people, as a part of their Concrete and Gold Tour. The band was scheduled to return on 12 December 2022, but the concert was cancelled in March of that year in light of drummer Taylor Hawkins' death.
 British singer-songwriter Ed Sheeran performed at the stadium on 15, 16 and 17 March 2018, to an attendance of 243,513 over the three nights, as part of his ÷ Tour. He returned to perform on 24 and 25 February 2023, as part of his +–=÷x (Mathematics) Tour.
 Queen + Adam Lambert performed at the stadium on 15 February 2020 as part of their Rhapsody Tour.
 American pop-star Michael Jackson planned to play here «Millennium Concert» on December 31, 1999. Later these plans were suspended and concert was cancelled.
 On Sunday, 16 February 2020 the fund raising concert Fire Fight Australia was held which included live performances by Lee Kernaghan, Conrad Sewell, Baker Boy, Daryl Braithwaite, Pete Murray, Grinspoon, Jessica Mauboy, Illy, Guy Sebastian, Peking Duk, Delta Goodrem, Ronan Keating, Tina Arena, Alice Cooper, Amy Shark, 5 Seconds of Summer, Queen + Adam Lambert performing the same set as their Live Aid performance, Michael Bublé (Live cross from Rod Laver Arena), Hilltop Hoods (with Illy, Ecca Vandal, Adrian Eagle), and Montaigne), k.d. lang, Icehouse + William Barton and John Farnham + Olivia Newton-John and joined on stage for You're The Voice by Mitch Tambo, William Barton, and Queen's Brian May. The event was hosted by comedienne Celeste Barber and broadcast on television by the Seven Network and FOX8.
 American rock band Red Hot Chili Peppers performed at the stadium on 2 February 2023, supported by Post Malone, as part of their 2022 Global Stadium Tour.
 British singer-songwriter Harry Styles performed at the stadium on 3 and 4 March 2023, supported by Wet Leg, as part of his final performance for Love On Tour in Australia.
 American singer-songwriter Pink will perform at the stadium on March 16, 2024, for the final performance of the Oceania leg of her Summer Carnival tour.

Attendance records

See also

 2000 Summer Olympics venues
 List of sports venues in Australia
 List of national stadiums

References

External links

 ANZ Stadium official website
 Corporate Events Sydney
 
2000 Summer Olympics official report. Volume 1. p. 376.

Australian Football League grounds
Cricket grounds in New South Wales
Soccer venues in Sydney
Olympic stadiums
Rugby league stadiums in Australia
Rugby League State of Origin
Rugby union stadiums in Australia
Rugby World Cup stadiums
Sports venues in Sydney
National stadiums
Venues of the 2000 Summer Olympics
Olympic athletics venues
Olympic football venues
Multi-purpose stadiums in Australia
American Bowl venues
Stadium Australia
Parramatta Eels
Stadium Australia
Stadium Australia
Sports venues completed in 1999
New South Wales Waratahs
Sydney Swans
North East Australian Football League grounds
American football venues in Australia
Sydney Olympic Park
2023 FIFA Women's World Cup stadiums